Benji's Very Own Christmas Story is a 1978 American Christmas television special featuring Benji the dog and is one of two such Benji specials to have been nominated for an Emmy Award. Patsy Garrett and Cynthia Smith reprise their respective roles as Mary and Cindy. The special was broadcast on ABC on December 7, 1978.

Plot
Mary and Cindy from the Benji films are on a promotional tour in Switzerland and are asked to be grand marshalls of a Christmas parade in Zermatt. Due to a broken leg, Kris Kringle is sending his elves out to deliver presents, and, as this will force them to miss the parade, he wants them to meet Benji first. With help from Mary and Cindy, Kringle realizes the true meaning of Christmas and performs a musical number showing how Saint Nicholas appears all over the world.

Cast and crew

Cast
 Benjean as Benji  (daughter of original Benji Dog, Higgins) 
 Patsy Garrett as Mary
 Cynthia Smith as Cindy Chapman
 Ron Moody as Kris Kringle

Crew
Directed by Joe Camp.

Nominations and awards
Benji's Very Own Christmas Story was nominated for an Emmy Award in 1979 for Outstanding Children's Program along with A Special Sesame Street Christmas and Once Upon A Classic with Christmas Eve on Sesame Street being the eventual winner.

Actress Cynthia Smith was nominated for a Youth in Film Award (now known as the Young Artist Award) in 1979 for her performance. The other nominations in her category were Patsy Kensit for Hanover Street, Brooke Shields for Just You and Me, Kid, Mariel Hemingway for Manhattan and Trini Alvarado for Rich Kids. The winner was Diane Lane for A Little Romance.  The film was also nominated in the category of Best TV Series or Special Featuring Youth. Also nominated in the same category were The Waltons, Little House on the Prairie, Diff'rent Strokes with the eventual winner being Eight is Enough.

See also
 List of Christmas films
 Santa Claus in film

References

External links
Official web site of Benji and Joe Camp

1978 television specials
1970s American television specials
Films about dogs
American Broadcasting Company television specials
American television films
1970s English-language films
Christmas television specials
Christmas television films
Benji
Films directed by Joe Camp
Films scored by Euel Box
American Christmas television specials
Santa Claus in film